When the Law Rides is a 1928 American silent Western film directed by Robert De Lacey and starring Tom Tyler, Jane Reid and Frankie Darro.

Cast
 Tom Tyler as Tom O'Malley 
 Jane Reid as Becky Ross 
 Frankie Darro as Frankie Ross 
 Harry O'Connor as Henry Blaine 
 Harry Woods as The Raven 
 Charles Thurston as Joshua Ross 
 Bill Nestell as Snake Arnold 
 Barney Furey as The Little Man

References

Bibliography
 Langman, Larry. A Guide to Silent Westerns. Greenwood Publishing Group, 1992.

External links
 

1928 films
1928 Western (genre) films
Films directed by Robert De Lacey
American black-and-white films
Film Booking Offices of America films
Silent American Western (genre) films
1920s English-language films
1920s American films